Parliamentary elections were held in Guinea on 27 January 1980. The country was a one-party state at the time, with the Democratic Party of Guinea – African Democratic Rally as the sole legal party. The party produced a list of 210 candidates for the 210 seats (increased from 150), which voters were asked to approve. Voter turnout was reported to be 95.69%.

Results

References

Elections in Guinea
Guinea
1980 in Guinea
One-party elections
Single-candidate elections